Lieske Glacier is a tributary glacier draining the north slopes of Mount Olympus in the Britannia Range, Antarctica, and flowing north between Johnstone Ridge and Dusky Ridge into Hatherton Glacier. It was named by the Advisory Committee on Antarctic Names for Bruce J. Lieske, a meteorologist who wintered at Little America V in 1957.

References

Glaciers of Oates Land